Brady Watt (born 9 May 1990) is an Australian professional golfer from Perth, Western Australia. He was the number one ranked golfer in the World Amateur Golf Ranking for one week in June 2013.

Watt was the medalist in the 2013 Australian Amateur held at Woodlands, Victoria. He was also on the winning Ten Nations Cup team earlier that year.

Watt won his first professional event in 2021 at the inaugural Sandbelt Invitational played in Melbourne, Australia.

Amateur wins
2011 Lake Macquarie Amateur
2012 Riversdale Cup
2013 Australian Amateur Stroke Play

Professional wins (1)

Other wins (1)

Playoff record
PGA Tour of Australasia playoff record (0–1)

Results in major championships

CUT = missed the halfway cut
Note: Watt only played in the U.S. Open.

References

External links

Australian male golfers
PGA Tour of Australasia golfers
Golfers from Perth, Western Australia
1990 births
Living people